Zahra Kiani (born September 26, 1999, Esfahan) is a wushu taolu athlete from Iran. She is a four-time world junior champion and a silver medalist at the Asian Games.

Career

Junior 
Kiani's first major international competition was at the 2010 World Junior Wushu Championships where she earned the silver medal in girl's group C jianshu. She then made her debut at the Asian Junior Wushu Championships in 2011 where she won a gold medal in jianshu and a silver medal in jianshu. Two years later at the 2013 Asian Junior Wushu Championships, she earned a silver medal in jianshu and a bronze medal in changquan. A year later at the 2014 World Junior Wushu Championships, she won two gold medals and a bronze medal. The following year at the 2015 World Wushu Championships, she won the silver medal in compulsory changquan. That same year, she won two gold medals and a silver medal at the 2015 Asian Junior Wushu Championships and achieved the same result at her last junior competition which was the 2016 World Junior Wushu Championships.

Senior 
With her high placements at the 2015 world championships, Kiani qualified for the 2016 Taolu World Cup where she earned a silver medal in changquan and a bronze medal in jianshu. A year later at the 2017 World Wushu Championships, she earned another bronze medal in jianshu. At the 2018 Asian Games, she won the silver medal in women's jianshu and qiangshu combined. Her most recent competition was at the 2019 World Wushu Championships where she won a bronze medal in changquan.

References

External links 

 Athlete profile at the 2018 Asian Games

1999 births
Living people
Iranian female martial artists
Iranian wushu practitioners
Wushu practitioners at the 2018 Asian Games
Medalists at the 2018 Asian Games
Asian Games silver medalists for Iran
Asian Games medalists in wushu